The Charles Connell House is the present name of the residence of the Hon. Charles Connell (1810–1873). It is located at 128 Connell Street, Woodstock, New Brunswick. The house was designated a National Historic Site in 1975.

History 
This house was built by an unknown person circa 1839 for Connell. It represents the peak of classicism in local architecture. It was built in the Greek Revival style, where wood is used to imitate the look of stone.

Past use 

In the late 19th and early 20th century, it was divided into apartments. It was made into a double tenement in the 1890s, and further subdivided into three apartments circa 1920, with a fourth created about 1960.

Current use 
The house was purchased by the Carleton County Historical Society in 1975, and is currently used to house the society's archives, artifacts and office. A restoration of the layout of the house, before it was broken up into apartments, was completed in 2008.

The Connell House is also available for business meetings, weddings, receptions, and parties for a small fee.  The Connell House is fully licensed and has a fully stocked caterer's kitchen.

References

External links 
 ToW Photo Gallery — #14
 Historical Society page on the house
 

Buildings and structures in Carleton County, New Brunswick
Greek Revival houses in Canada
National Historic Sites in New Brunswick
History museums in New Brunswick
Historic house museums in Canada
Woodstock, New Brunswick
Houses in New Brunswick
Canadian Register of Historic Places in New Brunswick